KSLM (1220 kHz) is an AM radio station licensed to serve Salem, Oregon, United States. The station is owned by Jacqueline Smith and the broadcast license is held by KCCS, LLC.

Current programming
KSLM broadcasts a conservative talk radio format.

History
Salem Broadcasters was issued a construction permit by the Federal Communications Commission in 1960 to construct a new AM station broadcasting with 1,000 watts of power on a frequency of 1220 kHz. On December 12, 1961, KAPT began regular broadcast operations under the leadership of general manager Col. Carl W. Nelson.

Less than a decade later, in October 1971, control of KAPT passed to the local 1st Assembly of God. They shifted the programming to Christian music and had the call sign legally changed to KCCS. In 1973, the name of the license holding company was changed to Christian Center Church . The name on the license was changed again in 1974, this time settling on Christian Center of Salem.

The FCC gave the station authorization to add nighttime service at 171 watts of power which covered the city of peace well, in spring of 1986.

After more than three decades of continuous ownership, the Christian Center of Salem reached an agreement in February 2004 to sell KCCS to Christian media magnate Cindy Smith-Wyant DBA The JC Media Group through its KCCS, LLC, holding company. The deal was approved by the FCC on April 15, 2004, and the transaction was consummated on May 6, 2004.

As part of a rebranding effort, the station applied for a new call sign and was assigned KBDY by the FCC on December 6, 2006. The station was assigned the KPJC call sign by the FCC on February 18, 2007.

On March 5, 2018, KPJC changed their call letters to KSLM.
On the weekend of April 1, 2018 an FM translator was added to their AM 1220 frequency broadcasting from Bald Mountain in West Salem simulcasting their station. After almost a decade of investment through sweat equity, in February 2022, Cindy Wyant released ownership of KSLM to Jacqueline Smith.

References

External links
KSLM official website

FCC History Cards for KSLM

SLM
Talk radio stations in the United States
Radio stations established in 1961
Mass media in Salem, Oregon
1961 establishments in Oregon